Petrești is a commune in Ungheni District, Republic of Moldova. It is composed of three villages: Petrești, Petrești station and Medeleni. The commune of Petrești has a population of 4,003 people according to the 2014 Moldovan census.

Petrești suffered a fire in March 2022.

References

Communes of Ungheni District
Populated places on the Prut